Yari Montella (born 5 January 2000) is an Italian motorcycle racer, currently contracted to Barni Spark Racing Team, in the 2023 Supersport World Championship.

Career

FIM CEV Moto3 Junior World Championship

2016
Montella made his debut in motorcycle racing at age 16, riding for Sic58 Squadra Corse in the 2016 FIM CEV Moto3 Junior World Championship, partnered by Tony Arbolino. Montella finished in the points three times during the season, his highest finish being a 7th place in the last round of Valencia. His teammate, Arbolino, won a race, and was second in another.

2017
In 2017, Montella stayed with Sic58 Squadra Corse for the 2017 season, but was partnered by Mattia Casadei. Montella did better than in his first season, finishing in the points five times, his season's best finish a 5th place in Estoril.

2018
Once again, for the 2018 season, Montella stayed with Sic58 Squadra Corse, this time partnered by Bruno Ieraci. Montella finished in the points six times throughout the season, ending with a career high 34 points, 17th in the standings.

Moto3 World Championship
In 2018, Montella was handed two wild-card appearances in the 2018 Moto3 World Championship, also in the colors of Sic58 Squadra Corse, for the San Marino and the Australian Grand Prixs, but did not get points, finishing in 19th and 16th respectively.

FIM CEV Moto2 European Championship

2019
For the 2019 season, Montella graduated from Moto3 Junior, to the Moto2 European championship. He, and teammate Tommaso Marcon, rode for Speed Up's Team Ciatti. Montella had two 3rd place finishes, in Catalunya and Valencia, and ended the season 7th in the standings with 77 points.

2020
The 2020 season would be the breakthrough in Montella's career. Remaining with Speed Up and Team Ciatti, Montella would dominate the season, winning the first 6 races, winning 8 out of the 11 races, and finishing in the top two in 10 out of the 11 races held that season. His only retirement came in Aragon, and Montella won the title by 44 points ahead of second place Niki Tuuli. After his performance, Montella was signed to a full-time Moto2 seat, by Speed Up.

Moto2 World Championship

2021
Speed Up and Montella came into the 2021 Moto2 World Championship with high hopes, with the team having two podiums in 2020. Teammate Jorge Navarro was coming into his fifth season of Moto2, and started off with two points finishes straight away. But Montella struggled mightily, failing to finish in the points for the first four races of the season. On the fifth weekend in France, Montella suffered a wrist injury in practice, and an operation was deemed necessary by doctors. This ruled him out of not just the French race, but also the Italian, Catalan, German, and Dutch Grand Prixs. His replacement, Fermín Aldeguer, finished in 12th in Italy, his first race in the category, leading to questions about Montella's inability to score points. Montella returned for the next two rounds, a double-header in Austria, but once again failed to score points. Citing bugging injury concerns, Speed Up decided to suspend Montella for the next two races, Silverstone and Aragon, in order to ensure he heals properly. His replacement was once again Fermín Aldeguer, who scored a brilliant 7th place finish in Aragon. Montella came back for the next round, but after crashing out and scoring no points yet again, the team terminated his contract immediately.

Supersport World Championship

2021
Following the termination of his contract in Moto2, Yamaha gave Montella a wild-card appearance in the 2021 Supersport World Championship. He seized the chance, finishing race one in 10th, and race two in 6th place, in Portugal.

2022
In November 2021, following Montella's good performances in Portugal, Kawasaki announced they signed Montella to ride for the Kawasaki Puccetti team, in the 2022 Supersport World Championship. Montella will replace Philipp Öttl, who leaves the team, to graduate to the Superbike World Championship.

2023
Montella rides for the Ducati team, Barni Spark Racing Team, in the 2023 Supersport World Championship.
In tests and qualifying he proved to be fast with excellent bike performance. Unfortunately, after an excellent qualifying in Race 1 of the 2023 Phillip Island Grand Prix Circuit, he collided with  driver Adrián Huertas, who fell in front of him, cause to a wet race, with heavy rain. The race was immediately stopped with a red flag due to this serious accident. Accident caused Montella a compound fracture of the right clavicle.

Career statistics

Grand Prix motorcycle racing

By season

By class

Races by year
(key) (Races in bold indicate pole position; races in italics indicate fastest lap)

Supersport World Championship

Races by year
(key) (Races in bold indicate pole position; races in italics indicate fastest lap)

References

External links

2000 births
Living people
Italian motorcycle racers
Moto2 World Championship riders
Moto3 World Championship riders
People from Salerno
Sportspeople from the Province of Salerno
Supersport World Championship riders
21st-century Italian people